Benzil reductase ((S)-benzoin forming) (YueD) is an enzyme with systematic name (S)-benzoin:NADP+ oxidoreductase. This enzyme catalyses the following chemical reaction

 (S)-benzoin + NADP+  benzil + NADPH + H+

The enzyme also reduces 1-phenylpropane-1,2-dione.

References

External links 
 

EC 1.1.1